Forensic toxicology is the use of toxicology and  disciplines such as analytical chemistry, pharmacology and clinical chemistry to aid medical or legal investigation of death, poisoning, and drug use. The primary concern for forensic toxicology is not the legal outcome of the toxicological investigation or the technology utilized, but rather the obtention and interpretation of results. 
A toxicological analysis can be done to various kinds of samples.
A forensic toxicologist must consider the context of an investigation, in particular any physical symptoms recorded, and any evidence collected at a crime scene that may narrow the search, such as pill bottles, powders, trace residue, and any available chemicals. Provided with this information and samples with which to work, the forensic toxicologist must determine which toxic substances are present, in what concentrations, and the probable effect of those chemicals on the person.

In the United States, forensic toxicology can be separated into 3 disciplines: Postmortem toxicology, human performance toxicology, and forensic drug testing (FDT). Postmortem toxicology includes the analysis of biological specimens taken from an autopsy to identify the effect of drugs, alcohol, and poisons. A wide range of biological specimens may be analyzed including blood, urine, gastric contents, oral fluids, hair, tissues, and more. The forensic toxicologist works with pathologists, medical examiners, and coroners to help determine the cause and manner of death. In human performance toxicology, a dose-response relationship between a drug(s) present in the body and the effects on the body are examined. This field of forensic toxicology is responsible for building and implementing laws such as driving under the influence of alcohol or drugs. Lastly, forensic drug testing (FDT) is the detection of drug use among individuals in the workplace, sport doping, drug-related probation, and new job applicant screenings.

Determining the substance ingested is often complicated by the body's natural processes (see ADME), as it is rare for a chemical to remain in its original form once in the body. For example: heroin is almost immediately metabolised into another substance and further to morphine, making detailed investigation into factors such as injection marks and chemical purity necessary to confirm diagnosis. The substance may also have been diluted by its dispersal through the body; while a pill or other regulated dose of a drug may have grams or milligrams of the active constituent, an individual sample under investigation may only contain micrograms or nanograms.

How certain substances affect your body

Alcohol 
Alcohol enters your central nervous system through the blood stream through the lining within your stomach and your small intestine. Once it is in your blood stream, is passes through your blood brain barrier via blood circulation. The alcohol absorbed will reduce your reflexes, interfere with nerve impulses, prolong muscle responses, and affect other parts of your body as well.

Marijuana 
Marijuana, like alcohol, is also absorbed into the blood stream and passed through the blood brain barrier. However, the THC that is released from marijuana attaches to the CB-1 cannabinoid receptors which causes all of the effects experienced. These effects include, but are not limited to, mood changes, altered perception of time, and increased sensitivity.

Cocaine 
Cocaine is a stimulant unlike Marijuana or Alcohol. As soon as cocaine enters the bloodstream it reaches the brain in minutes. Dopamine levels are increased intensely and the effects can last up to about 30 minutes. The most common way to use cocaine is by snorting it through the nose but other methods could be by smoking it in a crystal rock form. But because dopamine levels are increased at such a rate this leads to an even worse come down leading to needing a higher dose to get the same effect as the time before if taken again. This is how some addictions begin. Some effects when taken are an increase of energy and happiness, paranoia, rapid heart rate, anxiety, etc...

Examples

Urine
A urine sample is urine that has come from the bladder and can be provided or taken post-mortem. Urine is less likely to be infected with viruses such as HIV or Hepatitis B than blood samples. Many drugs have a higher concentration and can remain for much longer in urine than blood. Collection of urine samples can be taken in a non-invasive way which does not require professionals for collection. Urine is used for qualitative analysis as it cannot give any indication of impairment due to the fact that drug presence in urine only indicates prior exposure. Different drugs can also stay in your urine for different amounts of time. For example, alcohol will stay within your urine for 7–12 hours, cocaine metabolites will stay for 2–4 days, and morphine will stay for 48–74 hours. One drug that will stay in your urine for a varying amount of time (dependent on the usage and frequency) is marijuana. For a single use, it will stay for 3 days, moderate use (4 times per week) will stay for 5–7 days, daily use of the drug will cause it to stay for 10–15 days, and a long-term heavy smoker will have it stay within their urine for less than 30 days.

Blood
A blood sample provides the toxicologist with a profile of the substance that the subject was influenced by at the time of collection; for this reason, it is the sample of choice for measuring blood alcohol content in drunk driving cases.

Hair
Hair is capable of recording medium to long-term or high dosage substance abuse. Chemicals in the bloodstream may be transferred to the growing hair and stored in the follicle, providing a rough timeline of drug intake events. Head hair grows at rate of approximately 1 to 1.5 cm a month, and so cross sections from different sections of the follicle can give estimates as to when a substance was ingested. Testing for drugs in hair is not standard throughout the population. The darker and coarser the hair the more drug that will be found in the hair. If two people consumed the same amount of drugs, the person with the darker and coarser hair will have more drug in their hair than the lighter haired person when tested. This raises issues of possible racial bias in substance tests with hair samples. Hair samples are analyzed using enzyme-linked immunosorbent assay (ELISA). In ELISA, an antigen must be immobilized to a solid surface and then complexed with an antibody that is linked to an enzyme.

Bone Marrow 
Bone marrow can be used for testing but that depends on the quality and availability of the bones. So far there is no proof that says that certain bones are better than others when it comes to testing. Extracting bone marrow from larger bones is easier than smaller bones. Forensic toxicologists use bone marrow to find what type poisons used. These poisons can include cocaine or ethanol.

Other
Other bodily fluids and organs may provide samples, particularly samples collected during an autopsy. A common autopsy sample is the gastric contents of the deceased, which can be useful for detecting undigested pills or liquids that were ingested prior to death. In highly decomposed bodies, traditional samples may no longer be available. The vitreous humour from the eye may be used, as the fibrous layer of the eyeball and the eye socket of the skull protects the sample from trauma and adulteration. Other common organs used for toxicology are the brain, liver, and spleen.

Detection and classification
Detection of drugs and pharmaceuticals in biological samples is usually done by an initial screening and then a confirmation of the compound(s), which may include a quantitation of the compound(s). The screening and confirmation are usually, but not necessarily, done with different analytical methods. Every analytical method used in forensic toxicology should be carefully tested by performing a validation of the method to ensure correct and indisputable results at all times. The choice of method for testing is highly dependent on what kind of substance one expects to find and the material on which the testing is performed. Customarily, a classification scheme is utilized that places poisons in categories such as: corrosive agents, gases and volatile agents, metallic poisons, non-volatile organic agents, and miscellaneous.

Immunoassays 
Immunoassays requires you to draw blood and use the antibodies to find a reaction with substances such as drugs. The substances must be specific. It is the most common drug screening technique. Using the targeted drug the test will tell you if it is positive or negative to that drug. There can be 4 results when taking the test. Those results can be a true-positive, a false-negative, a false-positive, and a true-negative.

Gas chromatography-mass spectrometry
Gas chromatography-mass spectrometry (GC-MS) is a widely used analytical technique for the detection of volatile compounds. Ionization techniques most frequently used in forensic toxicology include electron ionization (EI) or chemical ionization (CI), with EI being preferred in forensic analysis due to its detailed mass spectra and its large library of spectra. However, chemical ionization can provide greater sensitivity for certain compounds that have high electron affinity functional groups.

Liquid chromatography-mass spectrometry 
Liquid chromatography-mass spectrometry (LC-MS) has the capability to analyze compounds that are polar and less volatile. Derivatization is not required for these analytes as it would be in GC-MS, which simplifies sample preparation. As an alternative to immunoassay screening which generally requires confirmation with another technique, LC-MS offers greater selectivity and sensitivity. This subsequently reduces the possibility of a false negative result that has been recorded in immunoassay drug screening with synthetic cathinones and cannabinoids. A disadvantage of LC-MS on comparison to other analytical techniques such as GC-MS, is the high instrumentation cost. However, recent advances in LC-MS have led to higher resolution and sensitivity which assists in the evaluation of spectra to identify forensic analytes.

Detection of metals
The compounds suspected of containing a metal are traditionally analyzed by the destruction of the organic matrix by chemical or thermal oxidation. This leaves the metal to be identified and quantified in the inorganic residue, and it can be detected using such methods as the Reinsch test, emission spectroscopy or X-ray diffraction. Unfortunately, while this identifies the metals present it removes the original compound, and so hinders efforts to determine what may have been ingested. The toxic effects of various metallic compounds can vary considerably.

See also
Arsenic poisoning
Drug test

References

External links

 
Toxicology